The 2014 Judo Grand Prix Jeju was held in Jeju City, South Korea from 27 to 29 November 2014.

Medal summary

Men's events

Women's events

Source Results

Medal table

References

External links
 

2014 IJF World Tour
2014 Judo Grand Prix
Judo competitions in South Korea
Judo